Peter Uzunov  (born ) is a former Bulgarian male volleyball player. He was part of the Bulgaria men's national volleyball team at the 1996 Summer Olympics. He played for Panatinaikos Greece.

Clubs
 Panatinaikos Greece (1994)

References

1971 births
Living people
Bulgarian men's volleyball players
Place of birth missing (living people)
Volleyball players at the 1996 Summer Olympics
Olympic volleyball players of Bulgaria
Panathinaikos V.C. players